BXI may refer to:

Boundiali Airport (IATA airport code BXI), Boundiali, Côte d'Ivoire
Brussels Airlines (ICAO airline code BXI); see List of airline codes (B)
Diyari language (ISO 639 language code bxi)
BXI (EP), an EP by the Japanese band Boris and The Cult lead vocalist Ian Astbury

See also

 
 
 
 
 
 bx1
 BXL (disambiguation)
 B11 (disambiguation)